Edinburgh South may refer to:

 Edinburgh South (UK Parliament constituency)
 Edinburgh South (Scottish Parliament constituency)